A gearbox is a component of a propulsion transmission providing multiple gear ratios.

Gearbox may also refer to:

 Gear train, a component of a transmission
 Gearbox Software, a video game company
 Gearbox Records, a recording company
 Operation Gearbox, a World War II military operation in 1942
 Operation Gearbox II, a World War II military operation, 1942–1943